Children's Healthcare of Atlanta Arthur M. Blank Hospital (AMBH) is a planned freestanding, 446-bed, pediatric acute care children's hospital currently under construction at I-85 and North Druid Hills Road in Brookhaven, Georgia. It will be affiliated with the Emory University School of Medicine and will be the flagship hospital of Children's Healthcare of Atlanta. The hospital will provide comprehensive pediatric specialties and subspecialties to infants, children, teens, and young adults aged 0–21 throughout Atlanta and will feature an level I pediatric trauma center. Its regional pediatric intensive-care unit and neonatal intensive care units will serve the Atlanta and greater Georgia region. The hospital will also have a helipad to transport critically ill patients to and from the hospital. This undertaking is the largest healthcare project in Georgia's history.

History 
The project was originally announced by hospital officials on February 7, 2017 as a replacement hospital for the Egleston Hospital.

The project has an estimated cost of $1.5 billion and consists of an entirely new campus that is now under construction adjacent to the Interstate 85 and North Druid Hills Road in Atlanta. The Architect of Record and Prime (Lead Architect) on the project is Tennessee based ESa.

Children's campus is the largest health-care project in Georgia's history. Plans for it were first announced in February 2017. The 446-bed hospital is planned to be 19 stories tall and is scheduled to open in 2025. The plans for the campus includes two patient towers, an office building, a hotel, 20 acres of green space, and an already-constructed "Center for Advanced Pediatrics."

In addition to the new campus, CHOA officials have announced that they would be investing more than $40 million in traffic and infrastructure improvements in the surrounding regions.

The project has sparked interest from Emory University, leading them to buy the land directly across the street and plan a new adult hospital of their own along with medical offices to create a new medical district.

In January 2020, Georgia Power Foundation made a $15 million donation to help with construction of the new campus.

On October 12, 2020 it was announced that the new hospital would be named the Arthur M. Blank Hospital to honor a $200 million donation from the Arthur M. Blank Family Foundation.

Center for Advanced Pediatrics 
One of the first buildings to open on the campus, the Center for Advanced Pediatrics is an outpatient clinic that was built as a part of phase 1 of the construction plan. The 260,000 ft building opened on July 24, 2018. The facility is bringing 20 different pediatric specialties and clinics to the same building.

Main hospital 
In early 2020 workers started clearing the land that will be used to construct the main hospital building. The building will consist of 1.8 million square feet, 19 floors, and 446 beds.

After the hospital opens, inpatients from Egleston Hospital will be transferred over to the new hospital. CHOA officials have said that the future of Egleston Hospital is in question while Hughes Spalding Children's Hospital and Scottish Rite Children's Hospital will both remain open to serve the community.

See also 

 List of children's hospitals in the United States
 Egleston Hospital
 Children's Healthcare of Atlanta
 Emory University

References

External links 

 Official Website

Blank, Arthur M.
Proposed buildings and structures in Georgia (U.S. state)
Brookhaven, Georgia
Hospitals in Georgia (U.S. state)
Buildings and structures in DeKalb County, Georgia